The 2023 Challenge Cup, known for sponsorship reasons as the 2023 Betfred Challenge Cup, is the 122nd edition of the Challenge Cup, the main rugby league knockout cup tournament in British rugby league run by the Rugby Football League (RFL). It began over the weekend of 11–12 February 2023 and will end with the final, at Wembley Stadium on Saturday 12 August.

The defending champions are Wigan Warriors, who won the 2022 Challenge Cup Final, by narrowly defeating Huddersfield Giants 16–14.

Background 
The competition started on 11 February and will conclude with the final on 12 August. The final is returning to its traditional home, Wembley Stadium in London, after being played at the Tottenham Hotspur Stadium in 2022.  League One team Cornwall R.L.F.C. will make their first appearance in the competition having declined to enter in their debut season.

All professional RFL member clubs are invited to participate as well as a number of invited amateur teams including teams representing the British armed forces. This year the entry of the amateur clubs is split; in round 1, the armed forces teams entered along with the Scottish, Irish and Welsh champions with English teams from outside the National Conference League Premier Division making up the 36 teams to compete in the round. Ten teams from the National Conference League Premier Division will join in round 2, together with the 10 teams from League One.  Shortly after the format for the tournament was announced, West Wales Raiders withdrew from the competition. The RFL announced that rounds one and two would be altered slightly to cope with this by increasing the number of teams in round one to 36 and reducing the numbers of new clubs in round two from 21 to 20.

The Championship clubs with the exception of Toulouse Olympique who declined to enter, join the tournament in round 3. Rounds 4 and 5 reduce the lower league clubs to four before the Super League clubs enter in round 6.

Format and dates

First round
The draw for the first and second rounds were made at Wembley Stadium on 12 January 2023. Ties were played over the weekend of 11 and 12 February 2023.

Second round

Third round
The third round draw was made on 27 February.

Fourth round
The draw for the fourth and fifth rounds was made on Wednesday 15 March at Millom RLFC, the oldest amateur club. No new teams enter in these rounds so the fourth round comprises just eight matches.

Fifth round
Drawn immediately after the fourth round draw, the four fixtures will determine which teams from below Super League will progress to the draw with the 12 Super League teams.

Final

On 12 August 2022, the RFL announced that the Challenge Cup Final return to Wembley after its one year hiatus, and be played as a double header with the women's final. The final will be played on 12 August 2023.

Broadcast matches

See also
2023 Women's Challenge Cup

Notes

References

2023 in English rugby league
2023 in Welsh rugby league
2023 in French rugby league
2023 in Irish sport
2023 in Scottish sport
Challenge Cup